The Worcester Tornadoes were a professional baseball team based in Worcester, Massachusetts, in the United States. The Tornadoes were a member of the Canadian-American Association of Professional Baseball, an independent baseball league which was not affiliated with Major League Baseball. The Tornadoes played their home games at Hanover Insurance Park at Fitton Field, on the College of the Holy Cross campus.

The Tornadoes were formerly owned by Perfect Game LLC.  On October 5, 2009, the majority stake of the franchise was sold to an undisclosed group of Maryland-based investors, which was later revealed to be Todd Breighner of Streamlined Sports, Inc. The directors of the ownership group included Charles Milanz and John Grammer. Jorg Bassiacos is executive vice president and general manager. The Tornadoes were managed by Rich Gedman, a former Major League catcher with the Boston Red Sox, until the end of the 2010 season.

The Worcester Tornadoes were named after the destructive tornado that hit Worcester on June 9, 1953.  At a home game on or around the anniversary of the tornado, the team remembered the victims with a moment of silence before the singing of the national anthem.

The Tornadoes, in their first season, won the Can-Am League Championship, sweeping the Quebec Capitales three games to zero.  After beating Quebec in the first two games at Stade Municipal, the Tornadoes clinched the championship on their home field on September 15, 2005.

On August 31, 2012, the Can-Am League announced that it was terminating the franchise's charter due to a slumping financial state which included failure to pay for uniform cleaning. League commissioner Miles Wolff declared he would try to find a new ownership group, but was unable to do so and the remaining Tornadoes players were either taken in a dispersal draft in October 2012 or given their outright releases.

Baseball returned to Worcester in 2014 with the advent of the summer collegiate league Worcester Bravehearts, who took the Tornadoes’ place at Fitton Field. Since then, the Boston Red Sox have relocated their AAA team from Pawtucket, Rhode Island to Worcester, where they play as the Worcester Red Sox.

Logos and uniforms
The official colors of the Worcester Tornadoes were black, burnt orange, and beige.  The primary logo consisted of a stylized, white baseball with burnt orange threads centered inside of a black ring outlined in burnt orange and black.  The words "Worcester Tornadoes" were arched inside of the ring in beige in scripted, capital letters.  An orange and black tornado wrapped around a baseball bat in the middle of the logo, with a white "W" superimposed over the center, with black outline.

The Tornadoes uniforms incorporated traditional baseball design.  The primary cap was black with a burnt orange brim, with the cap logo depicting a white "W" and a burnt orange tornado centered on the front.  The home uniform was white with black pinstripes and burnt orange piping.  The jersey featured the "Tornadoes" wordmark centered across the front in black with a burnt orange outline.  The player's number was centered below and to the left of the wordmark in orange with black outline.  The away jersey was gray with orange piping, with the "Worcester" wordmark arched across the front of the jersey in black with burnt orange outline.

Playoffs

Playoff Record: 5-6

During the 2007 season, the Tornadoes competed for the Commonwealth Cup with the Can-Am League's two other Massachusetts-based teams, the North Shore Spirit and the Brockton Rox. The Tornadoes finished in second (by three and a half games) behind the North Shore Spirit.

Quick facts
Uniform colors: White with orange piping and pinstripes for home games and grey for away games. Home with the word "Tornadoes" across the front and number on the back. Black hats with an orange brim and button and the letter "W" in script.
Logo design: A tornado swirling around a baseball bat with a "W" superimposed over the twister centered over a white baseball with orange threads.  The tornado and baseball design is centered inside of a black ring outlined in orange with the team's name arched around in beige, scripted letters.
Mascot:  Twister (2005-2012).
Broadcasters: Radio: Nick Gagalis
Radio Stations:  Ustream

References

External links
satellite view of the stadium

Canadian American Association of Professional Baseball teams
2005 establishments in Massachusetts
2012 disestablishments in Massachusetts
Baseball teams established in 2005
Baseball teams disestablished in 2012
Tornadoes
Defunct baseball teams in Massachusetts
Defunct independent baseball league teams
Professional baseball teams in Massachusetts